May mean:

A locale: 
Witch Creek, San Diego County, California

A Stream:
Witch Creek (San Diego County), a tributary of Santa Ysabel Creek, in San Diego County, California
Witch Creek (Kern County, California), a tributary of El Paso Creek, in Kern County, California